In zoology, a florivore (not to be confused with a folivore) is an animal which mainly eats products of flowers. Florivores are types of herbivores (often referred to as floral herbivores), yet within the feeding behaviour of florivory, there are a range of other more specific feeding behaviours, including, but not limited to:
 Granivory: the consumption of grain and seeds
 Nectarivory: the consumption of flower nectar
 Palynivory: the consumption of flower pollen
 Frugivory: the consumption of fruit

Diet

A florivore's diet consists of bulky foodstuffs, including the items mentioned above, yet also bark, roots, and similar items. Many florivores are also omnivores, meaning that their diets can also be supplemented by various small insects, for instance.

Examples

The majority of birds in the Psittacine family are florivores, which includes most parrots, parakeets, macaws, and cockatoos. Other notable florivores are hummingbirds, sparrows, and toucans. The crab-eating macaque acts as an invasive florivore in Mauritius, where it forages voraciously on flowers of native plants, including the endangered, endemic Roussea simplex.

See also
 Herbivore
 Frugivore
 Nectarivore
 Palynivore
 Granivore

References

External links

Bibliography
 Approaches to Plant Evolutionary Ecology by G.P. Cheplick
 Poultry Nutrition: A Comparative Approach by K. C. Klasing (Department of animal science, University of California, Davis, California 95616, 2005)

Animals by eating behaviors
Herbivory